These Charming People is a 1932 British drama film directed by Louis Mercanton and starring Cyril Maude, Godfrey Tearle and Nora Swinburne.  It was produced at Elstree Studios outside London by the British subsidiary of Paramount Pictures. It was based on the play Dear Father by Michael Arlen.

Cast
Cyril Maude as Colonel Crawford
Godfrey Tearle as James Berridge
Nora Swinburne as Julia Berridge
Ann Todd as Pamela Crawford
Anthony Ireland as Geoffrey Allen
Cyril Raymond as Miles Winter
C. V. France as Minx
Bill Shine (actor) as Ulysses Wiggins

References

Bibliography
 Low, Rachael. Filmmaking in 1930s Britain. George Allen & Unwin, 1985.
Wood, Linda. British Films, 1927–1939. British Film Institute, 1986.

External links

1931 films
1931 drama films
Films directed by Louis Mercanton
British drama films
British black-and-white films
Films shot at Imperial Studios, Elstree
1930s English-language films
1930s British films